Paul Hörbiger (29 April 1894 – 5 March 1981) was an Austrian theatre and film actor.

Life and work
Paul Hörbiger was born in the Hungarian capital Budapest, then part of Austria-Hungary, the son of engineer Hanns Hörbiger, founder of the Welteislehre cosmological concept, and elder brother of actor Attila Hörbiger. In 1902, the family returned to Vienna, while Paul attended the gymnasium (high school) at St. Paul's Abbey in Carinthia. Having obtained his Matura degree, he served in a mountain artillery regiment of the Austro-Hungarian Army in World War I, discharged in 1918 with the rank of an Oberleutnant.

After the war, Hörbiger took drama lessons and began his acting career in 1919 at the city theatre of Reichenberg (Liberec). From 1920, he performed at the New German Theatre in Prague. His fame grew when in 1926 he was employed by director Max Reinhardt at the ensemble of the Deutsches Theater in Berlin, reaching a high point with his appointment at the Vienna Burgtheater in 1940. He also appeared at the 1943 Salzburg Festival, performing in the role as Papageno in Mozart's opera The Magic Flute.

From 1928 he appeared in more than 250 films, mostly lightweight comedies of the Wiener Film genre popular among German and Austrian audiences during the 1930s and 40s. In 1936, he established his own filming company Algefa jointly with director E. W. Emo. In 1938, like many other celebrities, he openly acclaimed the Austrian Anschluss to Nazi Germany and continued his career, appearing also in propaganda films like Wunschkonzert ("Request concert") or Die grosse Liebe ("The great love"), which earned him an entry on Goebbels' Gottbegnadeten list ("God-blessed list"). On the other hand, Hörbiger inconspicuously met with opposition circles around Theo Lingen and Oskar Sima. In the latter days of World War II, he was arrested for treason by the Nazi authorities.

After the war, he resumed his career playing the porter who "talks too much" in Carol Reed's British film classic The Third Man (1949). Hörbiger, not speaking English at the time, learned his lines phonetically.

In the period 1947–49, he was chairman of the First Vienna FC football club.

Hörbiger remained one of the most popular German-speaking film actors of the 1950s and 1960s, starring in numerous Heimatfilm and Wiener Film productions. He again performed as the warm-hearted Viennese type and Heurigen singer, often together with Hans Moser and director Franz Antel. In his later years he again concentrated on theatre acting at the Burgtheater, where he last premiered in 1979 with Elias Canetti's Komödie der Eitelkeit ("Comedy of vanity").

Personal life
In 1921 he married the actress Josepha Gettke with whom he had four children. Hörbiger died in Vienna aged 86 and is buried in an Ehrengrab at the Vienna Zentralfriedhof. The actress Christiane Hörbiger, daughter from his brother Attila's marriage with Paula Wessely, is his niece. The actors Christian Tramitz and Mavie Hörbiger are grandchildren of Paul Hörbiger.

Selected filmography

 Sechs Mädchen suchen Nachtquartier (1928)
 Spione (1928, directed by Fritz Lang), as Chauffeur Franz
 The Great Adventuress (1928), as Detective
 Song (1928), as Sam
 The Gallant Hussar (1928), as Baron von Korporetzky
 Strauss Is Playing Today (1928), as Lamperlhirsch
 The Lady with the Mask (1928), as Michael - ein russischer Bauernknecht
 Dyckerpotts' Heirs (1928)
  Tales from the Vienna Woods (1928), as Alois Guschlbauer
 Hungarian Rhapsody (1928), as Kellner
 Das Letzte Souper (1928), as Balletmeister
 Die Räuberbande (1928)
 The Weekend Bride (1928), as Sekretær
 The Crazy Countess (1928), as Friseur Kose
 Asphalt (1929), as Ein Dieb
 The Woman Everyone Loves Is You (1929), as Dörsterlein
 Möblierte Zimmer (1929), as Kalinowski
 Ein kleiner Vorschuß auf die Seligkeit (1929), as Theobald Nuddlich, Fabrikant
 Why Cry at Parting? (1929), as Tortoni, ein Illusionist
 The Convict from Istanbul (1929), as Vlastos
 The Green Monocle (1929), as Snyder
 Women on the Edge (1929), as Siegfried Nürnberger, sein Impresario
 Three Around Edith (1929), as Nick
 Never Trust a Woman (1930), as Joachim
 The Immortal Vagabond (1930)
 Delicatessen (1930), as Josef, Diener bei Wallis
 Zwei Herzen im Dreivierteltakt (1930), as Ferdinand - ein Kutscher
 Nur Du (1930), as Graf Belmont, his stepfather
 Wie werde ich reich und glücklich? (1930), as Geheimrat Regen
 Das alte Lied (1930), as Xandel
 Two Hearts in Waltz Time (1930)
 Three Days Confined to Barracks (1930), as Zippert, secretary
 Der Herr auf Bestellung (1930), as Prof. Amanuel Wielander
 The Forester's Daughter (1931), as Der alte Baron
 Grock (1931), as Ein ungeschickter Geldsucher
 Her Grace Commands (1931), as Hofdetektiv Pipac
 The Merry Wives of Vienna (1931), as Anselm Leitner - Hofrat
 Walzerparadies (1931), as Dr. Pospischill
 Der Stumme von Portici (1931)
 The Squeaker (1931), as Josuah Harras, Reporter
Errant Husbands (1931), as Otto Rux, Weinhändler
 My Heart Longs for Love (1931), as Gehring
 The Unfaithful Eckehart (1931), as Karl Moor
 Der Kongreß tanzt (1931), as Heurigen Singer
 Sein Scheidungsgrund (1931), as Rasmussen, Hellseher
 Der verjüngte Adolar (1931), as Prof. Haselhuhn, Privatgelehrter
 Peace of Mind (1931), as Dr. Egon Breitner
 Poor as a Church Mouse (1931), as Count Friedrich Thalheim
 Distorting at the Resort (1932), as Fritz Garreis
 You Don't Forget Such a Girl (1932), as Direktor Leopold Schrader
 A Tremendously Rich Man (1932), as Linkerton
 Peter Voss, Thief of Millions (1932), as Bobby Dodd
 Once There Was a Waltz (1932), as Franz Pirzinger
 A Mad Idea (1932), as Emil
 Quick (1932), as Lademann, Quick's manager
 Viennese Waltz (1932), as Verleger Haslinger
 Zwei glückliche Tage (1932), as Pepi Freisinger
 Drei von der Kavallerie (1932), as Peter, ein Ulan
 A Blonde Dream (1932), as Vogelscheuche
 Scampolo (1932), as Gabriel
 Annemarie, die Braut der Kompanie (1932), as Musketier Karl Lehmann
 Trenck (1932), as Löwenwalde, Präsident des österr. Gerichtshofes
 Frederica (1932), as Pfarrer Brion
 Paprika (1932), as Dr. Paul Schröder
 The Secret of Johann Orth (1932), as Lanik
 The Invisible Front (1932), as Kommisssar Borgmann
 The Emperor's Waltz (1933), as Graf Eggersdorf
 The Big Bluff (1933), as Arthur Richman
 Two Good Comrades (1933), as Fritz Lehmann
 No Day Without You (1933), as Bonifazius, der Maler
 Liebelei (1933, directed by Max Ophüls), as Der alte Weyring - Kammermusiker
 A Song for You (1933), as Schindler
 Greetings and Kisses, Veronika (1933), as Paul Rainer
 Homecoming to Happiness (1933), as Karl Gruber
 Waltz War (1933), as Joseph Lanner
 Pardon, tévedtem (1933), as Murray Pál zongoramûvész
 Scandal in Budapest (1933), as Paul Murray
 Des jungen Dessauers große Liebe (1933), as Der Kaiser
 Miss Madame (1934), as Peter Valentin, Prokurist
 My Heart Calls You (1934), as Director Arvelle
 ...heute abend bei mir (1934), as Baron Denhoff
 The Csardas Princess (1934), as Feri von Kerekes
 Rosen aus dem Süden (1934), as Johann Strauß
 Playing with Fire (1934), as Dr. Alfred Kramer
 Spring Parade (1934), as Kaiser Franz Joseph
  (1934), as Hubertus Behmer
 An Evening Visit (1934), as Karl Maria Fernebeck, Prokurist
 The Gentleman Without a Residence (1934), as Professor Mangold
 Hearts are Trumps (1934), as Paulsen
  (1935), as Johann Strauß
 Fresh Wind from Canada (1935), as Meinkel, Angestellter Modehaus Granitz
 Last Stop (1935), as Karl Vierthaler, Straßenbahnschaffner
 Das Einmaleins der Liebe (1935), as Alois Weinberl
 The Royal Waltz (1935), as König Max II. von Bayern
 If It Were Not for Music (1935), as Florian Mayr, genannt 'Kraft-Mayr'
 Liebeslied (1935), as Pierre
 E lucean le stelle (1935)
 Die Puppenfee (1936), as Anton Freiherr von Kautzenbichl
 Three Girls for Schubert (1936), as Franz Schubert
 A Hoax (1936), as Peter Burgstaller, Oberkellner
 His Daughter is Called Peter (1936), as Dr. Felix Sandhofer
 The Cabbie's Song (1936), as Ferdinand Strödl, Fiakerkutscher
 Lumpaci the Vagabond (1936), as Lumpazivagabundus, Knieriem
 Kinderarzt Dr. Engel (1936), as Dr. Engel
 Duvod k rozvodu (1937)
 Peter im Schnee (1937), as Dr.Sonthofer
 Cause for Divorce (1937), as Toni Bernhof
 The Vagabonds (1937), as Haselhof
 Florentine (1937), as Peter Russel - Kapitän der 'Florentine'
 Immer wenn ich glücklich bin..! (1938), as Josef 'Pepi' Reinhold, Theaterdirektor
 Einmal werd' ich Dir gefallen (1938), as Der Baron
 Heiraten – aber wen? (1938), as Dr. Kramer - Chirurg
 Heimat (1938), as Franz Heffterdingk
 Liebelei und Liebe (1938), as Alexander Settegast - Koch
 The Blue Fox (1938), as Stephan Paulus
 The Stars Shine (1938), as Himself
 Drunter und drüber (1939)
 Men Are That Way (1939), as Dody, Musik-Clown
 Salonwagen E 417 (1939), as Friedrich Christian Lautenschläger
 I Am Sebastian Ott (1939), as Kriminalrat Baumann
 Immortal Waltz (1939), as Johann Strauß Vater
 Kitty and the World Conference (1939), as Huber
 Hochzeitsreise zu dritt (1939)
 Maria Ilona (1939), as Ferdinand V., Kaiser von Österreich
 A Mother's Love (1939), as Notar Dr. Koblmüller
 Opera Ball (1939), as Georg Dannhauser
 Vienna Tales (1940), as Ferdinand
 Falstaff in Vienna (1940), as Hofschneider Josef Sturm
 Beloved Augustin (1940), as Der liebe Augustin - ein Bänkelsänger
 Operetta (1940), as Alexander Girardi
 Herzensfreud - Herzensleid (1940), as Josef Radl - Weinbauer
 Wunschkonzert (1940), as Himself
 Oh, diese Männer (1940), as Eberhard Reitinger
 Wir bitten zum Tanz (1941), as Roublée
 Brüderlein fein (1942), as Franz Grillparzer
 The Great Love (1942), as Alexander Rudnitzky, Komponist
 So ein Früchtchen (1942), as Kurt Ruppert
 Die heimliche Gräfin (1942), as Erzherzog Johann Sylvester
 Whom the Gods Love (1942), as Von Strack
 Laugh Pagliacci (1943), as Canio
 Lache Bajazzo (1943), as Canio
 Black on White (1943), as Prof. Klaus
 Romantische Brautfahrt (1944), as Baron Dagobert Schatzberghe
 Schrammeln (1944), as Hans Schrammel
 Die Zaubergeige (1944), as Violinist Georg Helmesberger
 Der Hofrat Geiger (1947), as Hofrat Franz Geiger
 The Angel with the Trumpet (1948), as Otto Eberhard Alt
 Kleine Melodie aus Wien (1948), as Professor Griebichler
 The Mozart Story (1948), as Strack (the court chamberlain)
  The Prisoner (1949), as Dr. Bianchon - Armenarzt von Paris
 The Third Man (1949), as Karl - Harry's Porter
  (1949), as der Tod
 One Night Apart (1950), as Ferdinand Graf Lilienstein
  (1950), as Dechant von Köstendorf
 The Black Forest Girl (1950), as Domkapellmeister
 The Orplid Mystery (1950), as Musik-Clown 'The Great Teatch'
  (1950), as Carl Millöcker
 Der Teufel führt Regie (1951), as Pierre Darcy
 Der alte Sünder (1951), as Ferdinand Bauer
 Die Frauen des Herrn S. (1951), as Sokrates
  (1951), as Franz Jungwirt
 Veronika the Maid (1951), as Jansen sen.
 Der fidele Bauer (1951), as Matthias Scheichelroither
 When the Evening Bells Ring (1951), as Lehrer Storm
 Hallo Dienstmann (1952), as Professor Ferdinand Godai
 Voices of Spring (1952), as Lukas, Hausmeister
 My Name is Niki (1952), as Hieronymus Spitz
 Mein Herz darfst du nicht fragen (1952), as Geheimrat Hollbach
 The Land of Smiles (1952), as Professor Ferdinand Licht
 Mikosch Comes In (1952), as Dr. Paliwec
 I Lost My Heart in Heidelberg (1952), as Josef Degener
 You Only Live Once (1952), as Karl Heinemann
 1. April 2000 (1952), as Augustin
  (1952), as Hermann Gerstinger
 Die Fiakermilli (1953), as Honigberger, Pianist
 We'll Talk About Love Later (1953), as Geschäftsführer der 'Fledermaus'
 The Rose of Stamboul (1953), as Mehemed Pascha
 Drei, von denen man spricht (1953), as Präsident
 Young Heart Full of Love (1953), as Landesstallmeister
 Grandstand for General Staff (1953), as Oberst v. Leuckfeld
 The Dancing Heart (1953), as Fürst (Prince)
 Life Begins at Seventeen (1953), as Jacques Peronne
 The Private Secretary (1953), as Portier Julius
 Die Perle von Tokay (1954), as Ferencz Körös von Köröshazy, General a.D.
 The Abduction of the Sabine Women (1954), as Professor Martin Gollwitz
 The Faithful Hussar (1954), as Eberhard Wacker
 My Sister and I (1954), as Christines Vater
 The Gypsy Baron (1954), as Barinkay
 The Beautiful Miller (1954), as Albert Krügler
  (1954), as Bruder Martin
 Schützenliesel (1954), as Kaspar
 A Parisian in Rome (1954), as Professor Roth
 Victoria in Dover (1954), as Prof. Landmann
 Baron Tzigane (1954), as Barinkay
 Secrets of the City (1955), as Herbert Klein
 The Blue Danube (1955), as Schröder
 Marriage Sanitarium (1955), as Professor Thomas Eschenburg
 One Woman Is Not Enough? (1955), as Spielwaren-Ladenbesitzer Schratt
 Die Deutschmeister (1955), as Kaiser Franz Joseph
 Bandits of the Autobahn (1955), as Vater Heinze
 The Happy Wanderer (1955), as Dr. Peters, Tonis Vater
 My Leopold (1955), as Gottlieb Weigelt
 Du mein stilles Tal (1955), as Herr Kramer
 Die Försterbuben (1955), as Michael Schwarzaug, Gastwirt
 Charley's Aunt (1956), as August Sallmann
 Bademeister Spargel (1956), as Engelbert Spargel
 ...und wer küßt mich? (1956), as Bauer
 Lügen haben hübsche Beine (1956)
 Hilfe - sie liebt mich (1956), as Brösel, Angestellter bei "Tourist"
  (1956), as August Knieriem, Schuster
 Her Corporal (1956), as Gottfried Lampl
 Was die Schwalbe sang (1956), as Philipp Meyen
 Das Donkosakenlied (1956), as Professor Hartmann
 Manöverball (1956), as Erzherzog Roderich
 Die Christel von der Post (1956), as Ferdinand Brenneis, Hotelbesitzer
 Der schräge Otto (1957), as Vater Müller
 The Winemaker of Langenlois (1957), as Korbinian Grammelshuber, Verwalter
 … und die Liebe lacht dazu (1957), as Graf Ferdinand von Ausberg
  (1957), as Gustav Prebichl
 Lemke's Widow (1957), as Fürst Ludwig
 Hoch droben auf dem Berg (1957), as Ferdinand Broneder
 Der schönste Tag meines Lebens (1957), as Direktor
 Heimweh … dort, wo die Blumen blühn (1957), as Abt
 Vienna, City of My Dreams (1957), as Vater Lehnert
 Candidates for Marriage (1958), as Ferdinand Haslinger
 Hello Taxi (1958), as Franz Schwarzl
  (1958), as Generalfeldmarschall Radetzky
 Sebastian Kneipp (1958), as Erzherzog Joseph
 Heimat – Deine Lieder (1959), as Heimleiter
  (1960), as Schulz
 Kauf dir einen bunten Luftballon (1961), as Professor Engelbert
  (1961), as Berger
 Der Orgelbauer von St. Marien (1961), as Franz Burgmann und Josef Burgmann
 Drei Liebesbriefe aus Tirol (1962), as Dr. Franz
 Dance with Me Into the Morning (1962), as Johann Ebeseder
 … und ewig knallen die Räuber (1962), as Der nasse Elias
 Die lustigen Vagabunden (1962), as George
 Don't Fool with Me (1963), as Raimund Valentin
 Our Crazy Nieces (1963), as Franz Eierlein
 Im singenden Rößl am Königssee (1963), as Amtsgerichtsrat Zwicker
 Ferien vom Ich (1963), as Blümchen
 Die ganze Welt ist himmelblau (1964), as Mr. Muckenhuber
 I Learned It from Father (1964), as Julius Knackert
 Die große Kür (1964), as Franz Haslinger
 Happy-End am Attersee (1964), as Severin Petermann
 Der Alpenkönig und der Menschenfeind (1965), as Astragalus
 Call of the Forest (1965), as Gustl Wegrainer
 Das ist mein Wien (1965)
  (1972), as Xaver Doppler

Awards
 State actor (Staatsschauspieler) (1942)
 Decoration of Honour in Gold for Services to the Republic of Austria (1964)
 Medal of the Austrian capital Vienna (1964)
 Kammerschauspieler (1969)
 Film Award for many years of excellent work in the German film industry (1969)
 Girardi Ring (1972)
 Austrian Cross of Honour for Science and Art, 1st class (1974)
 Honorary Ring of Vienna (1977)
 Nestroy Ring (1980)

References

External links
 
 Paul Hörbiger at Virtual History

1894 births
1981 deaths
Austrian male film actors
Austrian male silent film actors
Recipients of the Decoration of Honour for Services to the Republic of Austria
Recipients of the Austrian Cross of Honour for Science and Art, 1st class
Male actors from Budapest
Austro-Hungarian military personnel of World War I
Burials at the Vienna Central Cemetery
20th-century Austrian male actors